Kyle  or Kyles may refer to:

Places

Canada
 Kyle, Saskatchewan, Canada

Ireland
 Kyle, County Laois
 Kyle, County Wexford

Scotland
 Kyle, Ayrshire, area of Scotland which stretched across parts of modern-day East Ayrshire and South Ayrshire
 Kyles of Bute, the channel between Isle of Bute and the Cowal Peninsula
 Kyle of Durness, the coastal inlet which divides the Cape Wrath peninsula from the Scottish mainland
 Kyle of Lochalsh, Ross and Cromarty
 Kyle of Lochalsh Line, a primarily single track railway line
 Kyle of Sutherland, a river estuary

United States
 Kyle, Indiana, an unincorporated community
 Kyle, South Dakota, a census-designated place
 Kyle, Texas, a city
 Kyles, Missouri, a ghost town
 Kyle Canyon, Nevada
 Lake Kyle, Texas

People and fictional characters
 Kyle (given name), a Gaelic masculine given name (sometimes also given to females)
Kyle (musician), a hip hop artist from California
 Kyle (surname), a surname of Scottish origin
 David Kyles (born 1989), American basketball player
 Kyle (Child's Play), played by Christine Elise

Other uses
Kyle, a Scottish term for a strait
 KYLE-TV, a MyNetworkTV network affiliate
 Kyles Athletic, a shinty team from Tighnabruaich, Argyll, Scotland
 SS Kyle, a Newfoundland steamship
 Tropical Storm Kyle

See also
 
 
 Keal (disambiguation)
 Keel (disambiguation)
 Keele (disambiguation)
 Kiel (disambiguation)
 Kil (disambiguation)
 Kile (disambiguation)
 Kill (disambiguation)
 Kyhl
 Kyl (disambiguation)
 Kyll